Reynolds stress equation model (RSM), also referred to as second moment closures are the most complete classical turbulence model. In these models, the eddy-viscosity hypothesis is avoided and the individual components of the Reynolds stress tensor are directly computed. These models use the exact Reynolds stress transport equation for their formulation. They account for the directional effects of the Reynolds stresses and the complex interactions in turbulent flows. Reynolds stress models offer significantly better accuracy than eddy-viscosity based turbulence models, while being computationally cheaper than Direct Numerical Simulations (DNS) and Large Eddy Simulations.

Shortcomings of Eddy-viscosity based models 
For instance, in flows with streamline curvature, flow separation, flows with zones of re-circulating flow or flows influenced by mean rotational effects, the performance of these models is unsatisfactory.

Such one- and two-equation based closures cannot account for the return to isotropy of turbulence, observed in decaying turbulent flows. Eddy-viscosity based models cannot replicate the behaviour of turbulent flows in the Rapid Distortion limit, where the turbulent flow essentially behaves as an elastic medium (instead of viscous).

Reynolds Stress Transport Equation 
Reynolds Stress equation models rely on the Reynolds Stress Transport equation. The equation for the transport of kinematic Reynolds stress   is

The six partial differential equations above represent six independent Reynolds stresses. While the Production term is closed and does not require modelling, the other terms, like pressure strain correlation and dissipation, are unclosed and require closure models.

Production term 

The Production term that is used in CFD computations with Reynolds stress transport equations is

 =

Physically, the Production term represents the action of the mean velocity gradients working against the Reynolds stresses. This accounts for the transfer of kinetic energy from the mean flow to the fluctuating velocity field. It is responsible for sustaining the turbulence in the flow through this transfer of energy from the large scale mean motions to the small scale fluctuating motions.

This is the only term that is closed in the Reynolds Stress Transport Equations. It requires no models for its direct evaluation. All other terms in the Reynolds Stress Transport Equations are unclosed and require closure models for their evaluation.

Rapid Pressure-Strain Correlation term 

The rapid pressure-strain correlation term redistributes energy among the Reynolds stresses components. This is dependent on the mean velocity gradient and rotation of the co-ordinate axes. Physically, this arises due to the interaction among the fluctuating velocity field and the mean velocity gradient field. The simplest linear form of the model expression is

By convention,  are the coefficients of the rapid pressure strain correlation model. There are many different models for the rapid pressure strain correlation term that are used in simulations. These include the Launder-Reece-Rodi model, the Speziale-Sarkar-Gatski model, the Hallback-Johanssen model, the Mishra-Girimaji model, besides others.

Slow Pressure-Strain Correlation term 

The slow pressure-strain correlation term redistributes energy among the Reynolds stresses. This is responsible for the return to isotropy of decaying turbulence where it redistributes energy to reduce the anisotropy in the Reynolds stresses. Physically, this term is due to the self-interactions amongst the fluctuating field. The model expression for this term is given as 

There are many different models for the slow pressure strain correlation term that are used in simulations. These include the Rotta model 

, the Speziale-Sarkar model

, besides others.

Dissipation term 

The traditional modelling of the dissipation rate tensor  assumes that the small dissipative eddies are isotropic. In this model the dissipation only affects the normal Reynolds stresses.

 =  or  = 0

However, as has been shown by e.g. Rogallo,
Schumann & Patterson,
Uberoi,
Lee & Reynolds and Groth, Hallbäck & Johansson
there exist many situations where this simple model of the dissipation rate tensor is insufficient due to the fact that even the small dissipative eddies are anisotropic. To account for this anisotropy in the dissipation rate tensor Rotta proposed a linear model relating the anistropy of the dissipation rate stress tensor to the anisotropy of the stress tensor.

 =  or  = 

where  =  = .

The parameter  is assumed to be a function the turbulent Reynolds number, the mean strain rate etc. Physical considerations imply that  should tend to zero when the turbulent Reynolds number tends to infinity and to unity when the turbulent Reynolds number tends to zero. However, the strong realizability condition implies that  should be identically equal to 1.

Based on extensive physical and numerical (DNS and EDQNM) experiments in combination with a strong adherence to fundamental physical and mathematical limitations and boundary conditions Groth, Hallbäck and Johansson proposed an improved model for the dissipation rate tensor.

 = 

Using this value the model was tested in DNS-simulations of four different homogeneous turbulent flows. Even though the parameters in the cubic dissipation rate model were fixed through the use of realizability and RDT prior to the comparisons with the DNS data the agreement between model and data was very good in all four cases.

Such a behaviour cannot be described by a linear model.

Diffusion term 

The modelling of diffusion term  is based on the assumption that the rate of transport of Reynolds stresses by diffusion is proportional to the gradients of Reynolds stresses. This is an application of the concept of the gradient diffusion hypothesis to modeling the effect of spatial redistribution of the Reynolds stresses due to the fluctuating velocity field. The simplest form of  that is followed by commercial CFD codes is

 =  = 
where  =  ,  = 1.0 and  = 0.09.

Rotational term 

The rotational term is given as

here  is the rotation vector, =1 if i,j,k are in cyclic order and are different,=-1 if i,j,k are in anti-cyclic order and are different and  =0 in case any two indices are same.

Advantages of RSM 

1) Unlike the k-ε model which uses an isotropic eddy viscosity, RSM solves all components of the turbulent transport. 
2) It is the most general of all turbulence models and works reasonably well for a large number of engineering flows.
3) It requires only the initial and/or boundary conditions to be supplied.
4) Since the production terms need not be modeled, it can selectively damp the stresses due to buoyancy, curvature effects etc.

See also
Reynolds Stress
Isotropy
Turbulence Modeling
Eddy
k-epsilon turbulence model

See also
k-epsilon turbulence model
Mixing length model

References

Bibliography
"Turbulent Flows", S. B. Pope, Cambridge University Press (2000).
"Modelling Turbulence in Engineering and the Environment: Second-Moment Routes to Closure", Kemal Hanjalić and Brian Launder, Cambridge University Press (2011).

Turbulence
Turbulence models